Anastasija Samoilova (née Kravčenoka) (born 19 January 1997 Daugavpils, Latvia) is a Latvian beach volleyball player. She represents Latvia at the 2020 Summer Olympics in Tokyo 2020. Kravčenoka and partner Tina Graudiņa are the first Latvian women’s pair to qualify for the Olympics.

She participated in the 2013 European U18 Beach Volleyball Championship, with Tina Graudiņa, the 2015 European U20 Beach Volleyball Championship, with Tereze Hrapane, the 2016 European U20 Beach Volleyball Championship, and the 2016 European U22 Beach Volleyball Championships, with Tina Graudiņa, winning a gold medal.

Later she participated in the 2017 FIVB Beach Volleyball World Tour, as well as in the 2019 European Beach Volleyball Championship, with Tina Graudiņa, winning a gold medal. Kravčenoka married beach volleyball player Mihails Samoilovs, the younger brother of Aleksandrs Samoilovs, on September 2, 2022, and has been known as Samoilova since then.

References

External links 
 
 
 
 
 
 
 Tina Graudina Claims Latvian Title with Anastasija Kravcenoka at usctrojans.com
 Anastasija Kravčenoka at volleybox.net

1997 births
Living people
Latvian beach volleyball players
Latvian women's volleyball players
Beach volleyball players at the 2020 Summer Olympics
Olympic beach volleyball players of Latvia
Sportspeople from Daugavpils
Beach volleyball players at the 2014 Summer Youth Olympics
21st-century Latvian women